Ha Wo Hang (with Wo Hang meaning "valley of rice") is a village in Wo Hang, Sha Tau Kok, in the North District of Hong Kong. Part of the village is a walled village.

Administration
Ha Wo Hang is a recognized village under the New Territories Small House Policy. It is one of the villages represented within the Sha Tau Kok District Rural Committee. For electoral purposes, Ha Wo Hang is part of the Sha Ta constituency, which is currently represented by Ko Wai-kei.

History
Ha Wo Hang was established in 1730 by members of the Hakka Li Clan, branching out from the nearby village of Sheung Wo Hang.

At the time of the 1911 census, the population of Ha Wo Hang was 160. The number of males was 66.

Built heritage
Fat Tat Tong, at Nos. 1–5, was built in 1933. It is a Grade I historic building.

See also
 Walled villages of Hong Kong

References

External links

 Delineation of area of existing village Ha Wo Hang (Sha Tau Kok) for election of resident representative (2019 to 2022)
 Antiquities and Monuments Office. Hong Kong Traditional Chinese Architectural Information System. Ha Wo Hang Tsuen

Sha Tau Kok
Walled villages of Hong Kong
Villages in North District, Hong Kong